Amir Mahdi Jule (also Romanized as Amir Mehdi Jule, born 27 August 1980 in Tehran) is an Iranian screenwriter and actor.

He wrote 5 O'clock in the afternoon, Man of Many Faces (2017), Barareh Nights and Bitter Coffee, He is the author of the Mehran Modiri comedy series. He acted in The Good, the Bad, the Gaudy movie.

Personal life 
Jule is married. His daughter's name is Gandom. He is afflicted with multiple sclerosis and describes his experience in a television program. He wrote of the country's censorship of female actors on television (Shaghayegh Dehghan in Barareh Nights film) Jule kicked off a campaign with the hashtag #Censorship_and_I, talking about the challenges of depicting women's bodies.

Filmography

Writer 
Without Description - 2002
The Dots – 2003
Fasten Our Seatbelt – 2004
Barareh Nights – 2005
Mozaffar's Garden – 2006
Living on the condition of laughing – 2006
Mozaffar's Treasure (home screen) – 2007
Man of Many Faces (TV series) – 2008
Two-Thousand Face Man – 2008
Bitter Coffee (home screen) – 2010-09
My Villa (home screen) – 2012
I'm just kidding (home screen) – 2013
At the Margin – 2014
Sneezing (home screen) – 2015
At the Margin 2 – 2015
5 O'clock in the afternoon – 2017
Shishlik – 2021

Actor 

Dorehami – 2016
The Good, the Bad & the Corny (Peyman Ghasem Khani – 2016)
Wall to the Wall – 2016
Golshifteh – 2017
Hezarpa – 2017
Tsunami – 2018
Samurai in Berlin – 2018

Theater 

 A Midsummer Night's Dream – 2016 (Tehran, Fajr International Theater Festival, Shakespeare Theater Festival in Poland)
Play It Again Sam – 2016
Fourth generation operator – 2017
A relaxing colck – 2019

References

External links 

 
   
 Amir Mahdi Jule Website

1980 births
Living people
People from Tehran
Iranian male actors
Iranian screenwriters
Iranian male film actors
Iranian stand-up comedians
Iranian male television actors
People with multiple sclerosis